Dragoş Staicu (born 12 October 1985) is an alpine skier from Romania. He competed for Romania at the 2010 Winter Olympics.

References

External links

1985 births
Living people
Romanian male alpine skiers
Olympic alpine skiers of Romania
Alpine skiers at the 2010 Winter Olympics